Andriy Vasylyovych Novikov (born 20 April 1999) is a Ukrainian professional football striker who plays for Danish club Esbjerg fB.

Career
Novikov is a product of the different youth sportive school systems.

After spent career in the teams of amateur or lower level, in July 2019 he signed a deal with the Premier League club FC Oleksandriya and made his debut in the Ukrainian Premier League on 14 February 2021, playing as the second half-time substituted player in an away winning match against FC Mariupol.

Due to the Russo-Ukrainian War, which escalated in late-February 2022, Novikov terminated his contract with LNZ Cherkasy and on 5 April 2022, he joined Denmark Series club Kjellerup IF. However, 20 days later, he left the club again. On 3 August 2022, Novikov signed with fellow country club and newly relegated Danish 2nd Division side, Esbjerg fB.

References

External links 
 
 

1999 births
Living people
People from Cherkasy Oblast
Piddubny Olympic College alumni
Ukrainian footballers
Association football forwards
FC Kovel-Volyn Kovel players
FC Volyn Lutsk players
FC Zorya Luhansk players
FC Oleksandriya players
FC LNZ Cherkasy players
Kjellerup IF players
Esbjerg fB players
Ukrainian Premier League players
Ukrainian First League players
Ukrainian Amateur Football Championship players
Ukrainian expatriate footballers
Ukrainian expatriate sportspeople in Denmark
Expatriate men's footballers in Denmark
Sportspeople from Cherkasy Oblast